Loaiza is a surname. Notable people with the surname include:

Armando Loaiza (1943-2016), Bolivian politician
Carlos Silva Loaiza (1919–2009), Colombian footballer 
Elizabeth Loaiza Junca (born 1989), Colombian model
Esteban Loaiza (born 1971), Mexican baseball pitcher
Henry Loaiza-Ceballos, Colombian drug dealer
Herman Loaiza (born 1956), Colombian racing cyclist
Juan Carlos Loaiza, Chilean rodeo horse rider
Miguel Loaiza (born 1983), Bolivian footballer